Jefté Betancor Sánchez (born 6 July 1993) is a Spanish professional footballer who plays as a forward for Cypriot First Division club Pafos FC, on loan from CFR Cluj.

Club career

Spain
Born in Las Palmas, Canary Islands, Betancor was noted as a 17-year-old at UD Vecindario, being called to the Canary Islands autonomous team and invited by Real Madrid to play an international tournament with its youth side in April 2011. In the 2011–12 season, Hércules CF director of football Sergio Fernández decided to sign the player for the club's youth system, and he immediately started appearing for the reserves in the regional leagues.

On 27 August 2011, first-team manager Juan Carlos Mandiá handed Betancor his professional debut, as he played injury time in a 2–0 home win against FC Cartagena in the Segunda División. After his release, he competed solely in his country's lower leagues until 2018, which included two spells at CF Unión Viera.

Austria
Betancor moved abroad in early 2018, signing with modest Austrian side ATSV Stadl-Paura. In the ensuing off-season he joined SV Mattersburg also in the country, making his first appearance in top-flight football on 11 August and scoring in the Bundesliga away fixture against TSV Hartberg (4–2 loss). On 22 January 2019, he was loaned to SK Vorwärts Steyr until 30 June.

On 26 June 2019, Betancor joined SV Ried also in Austria. He was crowned 2. Liga champion in his only season.

Romania
Betancor moved to Romania in September 2020 with FC Voluntari, helping the club retain its Liga I status before signing for FCV Farul Constanța the next summer. In December 2021, he was handed the Foreign Player of the Year award by the Gazeta Sporturilor daily after netting 19 times during the calendar year.

On 18 June 2022, Betancor transferred to five-time defending champions CFR Cluj.

Honours
Ried
2. Liga: 2019–20

CFR Cluj
Supercupa României runner-up: 2022

Individual
Foreign Player of the Year in Romania (Gazeta Sporturilor): 2021
Gazeta Sporturilor Romania Player of the Month: August 2021
Liga I Team of the Season: 2021–22

References

External links

1993 births
Living people
Spanish footballers
Footballers from Las Palmas
Association football forwards
Segunda División players
Segunda División B players
Tercera División players
Divisiones Regionales de Fútbol players
Hércules CF B players
Hércules CF players
Ontinyent CF players
CD Tenerife B players
CD Eldense footballers
CD Badajoz players
UD Las Palmas Atlético players
Arandina CF players
Austrian Football Bundesliga players
2. Liga (Austria) players
ATSV Stadl-Paura players
SV Mattersburg players
SK Vorwärts Steyr players
SV Ried players
Liga I players
FC Voluntari players
FCV Farul Constanța players
CFR Cluj players
Cypriot First Division players
Pafos FC players
Spanish expatriate footballers
Expatriate footballers in Austria
Expatriate footballers in Romania
Expatriate footballers in Cyprus
Spanish expatriate sportspeople in Austria
Spanish expatriate sportspeople in Romania
Spanish expatriate sportspeople in Cyprus